Robert James Belushi (born October 23, 1980) is an American actor. In films, he is best known for his work on Sorority Row, One Small Hitch, and Valentine's Day. On television, he is best known as Allen ("The Buddy") on the third season of Spike TV's The Joe Schmo Show and Linus the Bartender on the ninth and final season of CBS's How I Met Your Mother. From 2020 to 2021, Belushi hosted the game show Get a Clue on Game Show Network.

Early life 
Robert James Belushi was born on October 23, 1980, and is the son of Jim Belushi and Sandra Davenport, and the nephew of John Belushi. His half-siblings are Jamison Belushi and Jared Belushi. He is a 2004 graduate of Wesleyan University.

Filmography

References

External links 

1980 births
Living people
21st-century American male actors
American game show hosts
American male film actors
American male television actors
American people of Albanian descent
American people of English descent
Place of birth missing (living people)
Male actors from Chicago
Male actors from Los Angeles